Thomas Lee's rice water rat (Tanyuromys thomasleei) is a species of rodent in the family Cricetidae. It is endemic to Ecuador, where it is found in middle-elevation forests on Pacific-facing Andean slopes. It is known from both intact and disturbed forests. It closely resembles T. aphrastus but has a few cranial and genetic differences.

References 

thomasleei
Mammals of Ecuador
Endemic fauna of Ecuador

Mammals described in 2019